Beach TV Properties, Inc., is an American television broadcasting company based in Panama City, Florida. Also known as the Destination Network, the company specializes in television stations that broadcast tourist information to visitors in the cities that Beach TV has a presence in.

Stations
 WPCT channel 46 (Beach TV): Panama City, Florida (flagship station)
 WAWD channel 58 (Beach TV): Fort Walton Beach / Pensacola, Florida
 WDES-CD channel 58 (Beach TV) Miramar Beach, Florida
 WGSC-CD channel 8 (Beach TV): Myrtle Beach, South Carolina
 WCAY-CD channel 36 (Key TV): Key West, Florida
 KNOV-CD channel 41 (NOTV): New Orleans, Louisiana
 WTHC-LD channel 42 (The Atlanta Channel): Atlanta, Georgia

External links
  - DestinationNetwork.com
 tripsmarter.com - Beach TV's official site

Television broadcasting companies of the United States
Companies based in Florida
Tourism in the United States
Panama City, Florida